The Gay Gang Murders are a series of suspected anti-LGBT hate crimes perpetrated by large gangs of youths in Sydney, Australia, between 1970 to 2010, with most occurring in 1989 and 1990. The majority of these occurred at local gay beats, and were known to the police as locations where gangs of teenagers targeted homosexuals and trans individuals. In particular, many deaths are associated with the cliffs of Marks Park, Tamarama, where the victims would allegedly be thrown or herded off the cliffs to their deaths. As many as 88 gay men were murdered by these groups in the period, with many of the deaths unreported, considered accidents or suicides at the time.

Today, a memorial to the victims is located in Marks Park.

Groups

Alexandria Eight 
In 1991, the "Alexandria Eight" were convicted for the murder of Richard Johnson the previous year in a bathroom at Alexandria Park. In a recording taken of the group in the prison, they also bragged of murdering a gay man at the Marks Park cliffs (described as "cliff jumping"). Though he met resistance from within the force, investigating officer Steve McCann followed up this evidence, eventually learning of the "Bondi Boys".

The Bondi Boys 
The Bondi Boys were the largest and most prolific of the groups, constituted of 30 men and women aged between 12 and 18. They are primarily associated with deaths at Marks Park, and also referred to themselves with the abbreviations PTK and PSK, generally understood to mean "People that Kill" and "Park Side Killers" respectively. In 1989, David McMahon, a victim who had escaped being thrown from the cliffs, identified Sean Cushman and another person as two members of the group. Neither were charged. While they attacked McMahon, they allegedly discussed a similar murder committed at the cliffs a month prior, pointing to them also perpetrating the death of John Russell.

When interviewed by Operation Taradale, former members of the Bondi Boys denied that anyone was killed by their group.

Tamarama Three 
Three men were convicted for the assault and murder of Kritchikorn Rattanajaturathaporn on the Marks Park cliffs in 1990.

Miscellaneous 
A 2017 report by ACON identified two further groups operating in the period, the "North Narra Boys" who focused on North Narrabeen, and an unnamed gang that operated in the eastern suburbs of Sydney and used baseball bats to attack LGBT individuals.

Investigations 

The murders and bashings that took place during the period were generally considered suicides or disconnected incidents at the time, and subsequently went largely uninvestigated for several decades. Because of this inaction on the part of the police, various "gangs" of anti-LGBT students were able to bash and murder gay men with little interference from authorities. The most notable investigations prior to the formation of "Operation Taradale" were those preceding, and subsequently undertaken after, the arrests of the "Tamarama Three" and "Alexandria Eight".

Operation Taradale 
Operation Taradale was the first effort to reinvestigate cases from the period, originating in 2001 when Detective Sergeant Steve Page noticed a similarity between the deaths of Ross Warren and John Russel. In both cases it had previously been found that the victims accidentally fell to their deaths from the cliffs of Marks Park. In 2005, the final report was delivered to deputy coroner Jacqueline Milledge, who subsequently recategorised the deaths of Warren and Russel as homicides, describing the original investigations as "grossly inadequate" and "shameful". It found that while police at the time were aware of the gangs of teenagers that committed the majority of these crimes, little was done to address the issue and early investigations into these attacks were "inadequate and naive".

Strike Force Parrabell 
On , Strike Force Parrabell was formed by the NSW police to investigate the circumstances of 88 deaths identified by several 2013 news articles and a 2000 submission to the Australian Institute of Criminology. The force specifically focused on crimes that took place between 1976 and 2000. In 2018, the Parrabell report was released, identifying 23 cases between 1976 and 2000 as "unsolved". Of the cases, 61% had insufficient information to determine if it was a "bias crime", and 22% had suspicions of being a "bias crime".

Parliamentary and judicial inquiry 
Following the recommendations of the Parrabell report, a parliamentary inquiry was initiated by the NSW legislative council in 2019. This inquiry expanded the scope to include the period between 1970 and 2010, and delivered its report in February 2021. The report largely focused on analysing the case studies of suspected victims, and of determining the failings in police response at the time. It found that a persistent culture of homophobia and transphobia within the police force had led to many cases of homophobic attacks lacking thorough investigation.

Further developments 
In 2015, a $100,000 reward was offered by the NSW police for information leading to the culprits behind the murder of Warren, Russel, and Gilles Mattaini.

In 2020, 49 year old Scott White was arrested for the murder of Scott Johnson in 1988. Although he initially pleaded "not guilty" to the charges, in January 2022 White admitted to the murder of Johnson. He was sentenced to 8 years and 3 months in prison later that year in May.

References

External links 

 The Gay Gang Murders: Illegitimate Victims, Disposable Bodies
 Parabell report
 Bondi Memorial

1989 in LGBT history
1989 murders in Australia
1990 murders in Australia
1980s in Sydney
History of Sydney
LGBT history in Australia
Murder in Sydney
Serial murders in Australia
Unsolved murders in Australia
Violence against gay men
Violence against LGBT people
Violence in Sydney